was a town located in Kitakoma District, Yamanashi Prefecture, Japan.

As of 2003, the town had an estimated population of 13,483 and a density of 714.90 persons per km². The total area was 18.86 km².

History 
On September 1, 2004, Futaba, along with the towns of Ryūō and Shikishima (both from Nakakoma District), was merged to create the city of Kai.

External links
Official website of Kai city 

Dissolved municipalities of Yamanashi Prefecture
Kai, Yamanashi